Bartolommeo Bonone, also called Bartolomeo Bernardi, (active 1491–1528) was an Italian painter of the Renaissance period.

He was son of an architect named Bologna or Bonone from Fontanella in the province of Bologna. He painted an altarpiece for the church of San Francesco, Pavia, now in the Petit Palais, Avignon. He is also the author of a Crucifixion fresco in the Duomo of Piacenza.
 He is the author of a Virgin in Glory (1507). He is thought to have been a native of Pavia.

References

Artists from Pavia
15th-century Italian painters
Italian male painters
16th-century Italian painters
Renaissance painters
Year of death unknown
Year of birth unknown